Pius Sielenu N'Diefi (born 5 July 1975) is a Cameroonian former professional footballer who played as a striker. He later worked as a forward coach and sporting director at Saint-Quentin.

Club career
N'Diefi learned of the death of his father the day before Germinal Beerschot was to play the second leg of the 2005–06 UEFA Cup against Olympique de Marseille. He was nevertheless part of the starting eleven for that match.

International career
N'Diefi was part of the Cameroon national team for the 2002 FIFA World Cup and the 2004 African Cup of Nations, as well as at the victorious 2000 and 2002 African Cup of Nations. He scored the winner in the infamous 2003 FIFA Confederations Cup semi-final between Cameroon and Colombia, where teammate Marc-Vivien Foé died on the pitch.

Career statistics

International goals
Scores and results list Cameroon's goal tally first, score column indicates score after each N'Diefi goal.

Honours
 Africa Cup of Nations: 2000, 2002

References

1975 births
Living people
Cameroonian footballers
Association football forwards
Cameroon international footballers
Cameroon under-20 international footballers
2000 African Cup of Nations players
2001 FIFA Confederations Cup players
2002 African Cup of Nations players
2002 FIFA World Cup players
2003 FIFA Confederations Cup players
2004 African Cup of Nations players
Ligue 1 players
Ligue 2 players
RC Lens players
ASOA Valence players
CS Sedan Ardennes players
Al-Gharafa SC players
Beerschot A.C. players
Paris FC players
JS Saint-Pierroise players
Stella Club d'Adjamé players
Cameroonian expatriate footballers
Cameroonian expatriate sportspeople in France
Expatriate footballers in France
Cameroonian expatriate sportspeople in Qatar
Expatriate footballers in Qatar
Cameroonian expatriate sportspeople in Belgium
Expatriate footballers in Belgium
Cameroonian expatriate sportspeople in Ivory Coast
Expatriate footballers in Ivory Coast
Expatriate footballers in Réunion
Cameroonian expatriate sportspeople in Réunion